Minxin Film Company, also known as China Sun Motion Picture Company Ltd. (1923–1930) was one of the earliest movie studios in the history of Chinese cinema and Hong Kong cinema.

History 
Established in 1922 in Hong Kong by director and actor Lai Man-wai, the so-called "Father of Hong Kong Cinema," with his brother Lai Pak-Hoi. China Sun moved to Shanghai in 1926 after economic turmoil in Hong Kong made production there near impossible. By the end of the 1920s, however, the company was in dire financial straits, as it struggled to compete with the much larger Mingxing Film Company as well as other studios, such as the Shaw brothers' Tianyi Film Company. It was ultimately saved by Lai's old friend Luo Mingyou, who suggested a pooling of resources to create a new company - the famous Lianhua Studios. Thus, in 1930, China Sun Motion Picture Company was absorbed into the newly formed Lianhua.

By 1936, however, Lai split off from the now declining Lianhua in control of Lianhua's Studio No. 1. This studio then formed the basis of a newly independent "Minxin Film Company."

Notable films
 A Poet from the Sea (1927)
 Romance of the Western Chamber (1927)
 Mulan Joins the Army (1928)

External links
 Incomplete list of China Sun-produced films from the Chinese Movie Database

Hong Kong film studios
Chinese film studios
Mass media companies established in 1922
Mass media in Shanghai
Companies based in Shanghai
Film production companies of China
Defunct film and television production companies of China
Mass media companies disestablished in 1936
1936 disestablishments in China
Chinese companies established in 1922